The Ahmadiyya Muslim Peace Prize, formally the Ahmadiyya Muslim Prize for the Advancement of Peace, is awarded annually "in recognition of an individual’s or an organisation’s contribution for the advancement of the cause of peace". The prize was first launched in 2009 by the Ahmadiyya Muslim Peace Prize Committee under the directive of the caliph of the Ahmadiyya Muslim Community, Mirza Masroor Ahmad. 

The Prize is announced annually at the United Kingdom Annual Convention and is presented the following year at the National Peace Symposium held at the Baitul Futuh Mosque in London. The Prize includes a monetary sum, which is normally set at 10,000 pounds sterling.

Recipients

References

Islam and society
Peace awards
Ahmadiyya
Awards established in 2009